Binker Golding is a British jazz musician, who has released solo albums on Gearbox Records and is one half of the MOBO award-winning jazz duo Binker and Moses.

Golding was born 1985 and comes from Enfield, London and went to Middlesex University obtaining a Bachelor of Arts degree in Jazz in 2007.

Discography

Solo work
Abstractions of Reality Past and Incredible Feathers (2019, Gearbox)
Dream Like A Dogwood Wild Boy (2022, Gearbox)

With Binker and Moses
Dem Ones (2015, Gearbox)
Journey To The Mountain Of Forever (2017, Gearbox)
Alive in the East? (2018, Gearbox)
Escape the Flames (2020, Gearbox)
Feeding The Machine (2022, Gearbox)

References

External links 
 Official website

Jazz saxophonists

1985 births
Living people